San Miguel de Aguayo can refer to:
San Miguel de Aguayo, Texas, also known as Mission San Jose
San Miguel de Aguayo, Cantabria, Spain
Marquis de San Miguel de Aguayo, Spanish nobility